James Cockman (April 26, 1873 – September 28, 1947) was a Canadian third baseman in Major League Baseball who played for the New York Highlanders in 1905. He stood at 5' 6" and weighed 145 lbs.

Career
Cockman started his professional baseball career in 1896 and batted .300 that year for the Virginia League's Roanoke Magicians. The following season, he played for the London Cockneys of the Canadian League. He batted a career-high .413 to win the batting title.

Although Cockman did "pretty good work with the stick," he was released by Toronto in 1898 and then went to the Atlantic League's Reading Coal Heavers. In 1900, Cockman played in the Eastern League, International League, and Interstate League. He posted a .307 batting average in the Interstate League, and it was the last time in his career that he would bat over .300.

From 1901 to 1903, Cockman played in the Western League with the Minneapolis Millers and Milwaukee Creams. He then spent most of the following four seasons with the Eastern League's Newark Sailors. In 1905, he hit just .232 but was acquired by the New York Highlanders (later known as the Yankees) in September. Cockman played 13 MLB games over the final month of the season. He went 4 for 38 (.105) at the plate, with 0 home runs and 2 runs batted in. At 32 years old, he was the oldest player to ever make his major league debut with the New York Yankees franchise.

Cockman went back to Newark in 1906. After short stints in Toronto and St. Paul, he played for the Western League's Lincoln Railsplitters from 1909 to 1911. In 1912, he batted .262 in the Nebraska State League and then retired after the season.

Personal life
Cockman died on September 28, 1947 in his hometown of Guelph at age 74. He was buried in Woodlawn Memorial Park, in Guelph.

References

External links

1873 births
1947 deaths
Canadian expatriate baseball players in the United States
Major League Baseball third basemen
Major League Baseball players from Canada
New York Highlanders players
Roanoke Magicians players
Guelph (minor league baseball) players
Indianapolis Indians players
Richmond Giants players
London Cockneys players
Reading Coal Heavers players
Buffalo Bisons (minor league) players
Wheeling Stogies players
Hamilton Hams players
Toronto Canucks players
Minneapolis Millers (baseball) players
Milwaukee Creams players
Newark Sailors players
Toronto Maple Leafs (International League) players
Lincoln Railsplitters players
St. Paul Saints (AA) players
Grand Island Collegians players
Baseball people from Ontario
Sportspeople from Guelph
Minor league baseball managers